Ali Aghamohammadi is the former deputy vice president for economic affairs of the Islamic Republic of Iran. He is currently member of the Expediency Discernment Council.

He was noted for his 2011 statement that the Iranian government is working on a "halal" (Islamically permitted) version of the Internet. “Iran will soon create an internet that conforms to Islamic principles, to improve its communication and trade links with the world." Some raised doubts about the feasibility of such a network.

See also
 Internet censorship in Iran

References

Year of birth missing (living people)
Living people
Iranian politicians